This is a summary of the electoral history of Hassan Rouhani, an Iranian politician who is currently President of Iran since 2013 and member of the Assembly of Experts from Tehran Province since 2000. He was previously member of the Islamic Consultative Assembly (1980–2000).

Parliament elections

1980 

He was elected to the Parliament representing Semnan with 19,017 (62.1%) out of 30,629 votes.

1984 

He was elected to the Parliament representing Tehran with 729,965 (58.3%) out of 1,251,160 votes. He was ranked 17th in the constituency and was elected in second round.

1988 

He was elected to the Parliament representing Tehran with 412,895 (47%) out of 878,298 votes.

1992 

He was elected to the Parliament representing Tehran with 432,767 (42.1%) out of 1,025,692 votes.

1996 

He was elected to the Parliament representing Tehran with 465,440 (32.5%) out of 1,429,909 votes.

2000 

Rouhan ran for a seat from Tehran, but lost the election. He was endorsed by Moderation and Development Party, Islamic Coalition Party and Combatant Clergy Association. He received 498,916 out of 2,931,113 votes and was ranked 40th.

Assembly of Experts

2000 
He received 120,819 out of 254,013 votes and won a seat in mid-term election from Semnan Province.

2006 

According to the Iranian Students News Agency (ISNA), he received 844,190 votes.

2016 

He received ≈2.23 million votes.

Presidential elections

2013 

Rouhani won the election with 18,613,329 votes (50.71%).

2017 

Rouhani won the election with 23,636,652 votes (57.14%).

Notes

References 

Hassan Rouhani
Electoral history of Iranian politicians